Véronique Ngo Mang (born December 15, 1984) is a track and field sprint athlete, competing internationally for France.

Biography
She arrived in France with her mother, brother and sister in 1995. She represented Cameroon until 2003 when she gained French citizenship. She started running at age 12 in France. She suffered a strained leg muscle in 2000 and a knee injury in 2001.

She won the bronze medal in the 4 × 100 m relay at the 2004 Olympic Games in Athens, Greece.

She competed at the 2005 Mediterranean Games in the 100 metres which was held at Almería. She went on to win gold, 0.02 ahead of compatriot Sylviane Félix. She later teamed up with Félix, Lina Jacques-Sebastien and Fabé Dia to win the 4 × 100 metres relay

She also competed at the 2005 Jeux de la Francophonie, in Niamey. She went on to claim gold in the 100 metre event, compatriot Fabienne Beret-Martinel claimed bronze. She also won gold in the 4 × 100 metres relay with Beret-Martinel, Aurelie Kamga and Carima Louami.

Mang competed at the 2006 European Athletics Championships in the 100 metres and 4 × 100 metres relay. Despite being considered a medal contender, she only managed to reach the semi-final stage in the 100 metres. In the relay, she teamed up with Fabienne Beret-Martinel, Adrianna Lamalle and Muriel Hurtis-Houairi. The French women ran an impressive heat and were the fastest qualifiers in a time of 43.38. In the final, they did not finish the race due to a failed baton exchange.

In June 2013, she ruptured a tendon, preventing her from competing for 12 months.

She retired in 2016. Her hobbies are music, dancing and collecting postcards.

References

External links
 
 

1984 births
Living people
French female sprinters
Cameroonian female sprinters
Athletes (track and field) at the 2004 Summer Olympics
Athletes (track and field) at the 2012 Summer Olympics
Olympic athletes of France
Cameroonian emigrants to France
Olympic bronze medalists for France
European Athletics Championships medalists
Medalists at the 2004 Summer Olympics
Sportspeople from Douala
Olympic bronze medalists in athletics (track and field)
Mediterranean Games gold medalists for France
Athletes (track and field) at the 2005 Mediterranean Games
Mediterranean Games medalists in athletics
Olympic female sprinters